The men's 4×100 metre freestyle relay event at the 1968 Olympic Games took place 17 October. The relay featured teams of four swimmers each swimming two lengths of the 50 m pool freestyle.

Medalists

*swimmers who participated in heats

Results

Heats
4 fastest teams from each heat advance to the final

Heat 1

Heat 2

Final

References

External links
Men 4x100m Freestyle Relay Swimming Olympic Games 1968 Mexico City (MEX)

Swimming at the 1968 Summer Olympics
4 × 100 metre freestyle relay
Men's events at the 1968 Summer Olympics